Year 1124 (MCXXIV) was a leap year starting on Tuesday (link will display the full calendar) of the Julian calendar, the 1124th year of the Common Era (CE) and Anno Domini (AD) designations, the 124th year of the 2nd millennium, the 24th year of the 12th century, and the 5th year of the 1120s decade.

Events 
 By place 
 Europe 
 March 26 – Henry I of England's forces defeat Norman rebels at Bourgtheroulde.
 April 27 – David I succeeds Alexander I, to become King of Scotland.
 December 21 – Pope Honorius II succeeds Pope Callixtus II, as the 163rd pope.
 Gaufrid is consecrated as the first Abbot of Dunfermline Abbey.
 The Dun Beal Gallimhe is erected by King Tairrdelbach Ua Conchobair of Connacht.
 In Ireland, Saint Malachy, the great reformer of the Church, is made a bishop.
 (Approximate date) – The High School of Glasgow is founded as the choir school of Glasgow Cathedral, in Scotland.

 North America 
 Arnald becomes the first Bishop of Greenland.

 Middle East 
 July 7 – Tyre falls to the Crusaders.

Births 
 Ottokar III of Styria, Margrave (d. 1164)
 Possible date – Eleanor of Aquitaine, Duchess of Aquitaine, queen consort successively of France and England, and patron of the arts (d. 1204)

Deaths 

 February 2 – Bořivoj II, Duke of Bohemia (b. c. 1064)
 March 15 – Ernulf, Bishop of Rochester (b. c. 1040)
 April 23 – King Alexander I of Scotland (b. c. 1078)
 June 12 – Hasan-i Sabbah, founder of the Nizari Ismaili state (b. c. 1250)
 December 13 – Pope Callixtus II, Burgundian-born Catholic religious leader (b. c. 1065)
 Guibert of Nogent, French historian and theologian (b. 1053)

References 

 

da:1120'erne#1124